Kushen Kishun (born 10 July 1991) is a South African cricketer. He made his first-class debut for KwaZulu-Natal in the 2010–11 CSA Provincial Three-Day Challenge on 10 February 2011.

References

External links
 

1991 births
Living people
South African cricketers
KwaZulu-Natal cricketers
KwaZulu-Natal Inland cricketers
Place of birth missing (living people)